The Change and Reform bloc was a bloc in the Parliament of Lebanon that represented the Free Patriotic Movement and its allies, including the Marada Movement, the Tachnag Party, the Lebanese Democratic Party, and several independent deputies. 

The bloc was formed in June 2005 at the end of the 2005 parliamentary elections with 21 deputies. It was headed by General Michel Aoun and was then in opposition to the government of Fouad Siniora and the March 14 alliance from 2005 to 2008. The parliamentary bloc included 27 deputies since the Lebanese legislative elections of 2009. In June 13, 2011, it was part of the Mikati government with 10 ministerial portfolios being a member of the parliamentary majority. In 2015, leadership of the Free Patriotic Movement was given to Gebran Bassil.

The Change and Reform bloc was succeeded by the Strong Lebanon bloc after the 2018 elections.

Electoral history

References

2005 establishments in Lebanon
Defunct political party alliances in Lebanon
Parliamentary blocs of Lebanon